Marinobacter adhaerens is a Gram-negative, rod-shaped and motile bactebacterium from the genus of Marinobacter which has been isolated from marine aggregates from the Wadden Sea in Germany.

References

Further reading

External links
Type strain of Marinobacter adhaerens at BacDive -  the Bacterial Diversity Metadatabase

Alteromonadales
Bacteria described in 2013